Bertia cambojiensis, also known as Vietnamese giant snail or Vietnamese giant magnolia snail, is a critically endangered species of air-breathing land snail, recorded from Cambodia and southern Vietnam.  It is a terrestrial pulmonate gastropod mollusc in the family Dyakiidae.

References

Dyakiidae
Gastropods described in 1860